P&A or P and A may stand for:

 Pensacola and Atlantic Railroad
 Phenol and alcohol procedure, used to surgically treat an ingrown toenail, also called a chemical matrixectomy
 Plugged and abandoned, in well drilling
 Prints and Advertising (P&A), a term from film distribution

See also 
 Pa (disambiguation)